In mathematics, the term adjoint applies in several situations. Several of these share a similar formalism: if A is adjoint to B, then there is typically some formula of the type
(Ax, y) = (x, By).

Specifically, adjoint or adjunction may mean:
 Adjoint of a linear map, also called its transpose
 Hermitian adjoint (adjoint of a linear operator) in functional analysis
 Adjoint endomorphism of a Lie algebra
 Adjoint representation of a Lie group
 Adjoint functors in category theory
 Adjunction (field theory)
 Adjunction formula (algebraic geometry)
 Adjunction space in topology
 Conjugate transpose of a matrix in linear algebra
 Adjugate matrix, related to its inverse
 Adjoint equation
 The upper and lower adjoints of a Galois connection in order theory
 The adjoint of a differential operator with general polynomial coefficients
 Kleisli adjunction
 Monoidal adjunction
 Quillen adjunction
 Axiom of adjunction in set theory
 Adjunction (rule of inference)

Mathematical terminology